The Irish Museum of Modern Art also known as IMMA, is Ireland's leading national institution for the collection and presentation of modern and contemporary art. Located in Kilmainham, Dublin, the Museum presents a wide variety of art in a changing programme of exhibitions, which regularly includes bodies of work from its own collection and its education and community department. It also aims to create more widespread access to art and artists through its studio and national programmes.

The Museum’s mission is to foster within society an awareness, understanding and involvement in the visual arts through policies and programmes which are excellent, innovative and inclusive.

History
Irish art collector Gordon Lambert met with Taoiseach Charles J Haughey and "told him if the State would establish a gallery he would donate his collection." The Irish Museum of Modern Art was established by the Government of Ireland in 1990. It was officially opened on 25 May 1991 by Haughey.

Its first Director was Declan McGonagle, who served for 10 years. He was followed by Enrique Juncosa, and then Sarah Glennie. Annie Fletcher has been Director since 2018.

Building and grounds
The Irish Museum of Modern Art is housed in the 17th-century Royal Hospital Kilmainham. The Royal Hospital was founded in 1684 by James Butler, the Duke of Ormonde and Viceroy to Charles II, as a home for retired soldiers and continued in that use for almost 250 years. 

The Royal Hospital is a striking location for displaying modern art. Designed by Sir William Robinson and modelled on Les Invalides in Paris, it is arranged around a courtyard and the interior has long corridors running along series of modest interlocking rooms. The original stables have been restored, extended and converted into artists' studios, and the museum runs an artist-in-residence programme.

Originally there was another option to build a new purpose-built museum in Dublin's docklands, but the Hospital proved to be the more pragmatic choice at the time, however "over the years... the lack of a large exhibition space has on occasion been a drawback."  Additionally, the Royal Hospital lacked adequate storage and by 2003 up to 20 national and international works were discovered to be badly damaged by "humidity and temperature fluctuations". The Office of Public Works assisted in finding and relocating the bulk of the collection in off-site warehouses, and even a storage container in the museum's car park.

Collection
IMMA holds the Irish National Collection of modern and contemporary art, consisting of over 3500 works by Irish and international artists. The collection's emphasis is on works produced post-1940 and features works by many significant artists including Marina Abramović, Louise Bourgeois, Joseph Cornell, Robert Rauschenberg, Sol LeWitt, Louis le Brocquy, Matt Mullican, Roy Lichtenstein and Lawrence Weiner. The collection is fully catalogued and searchable via a dedicated website.

The Hennessy Art Fund for IMMA Collection was launched in 2016 in part as a response to funding cuts preventing the museum from having a viable acquisitions budget to collect the work of emerging and mid-career artists since 2011. The fund is a new multi-year corporate partnership and acquisition fund to purchase works by Irish and Irish based artists that are not yet part of the IMMA National Collection of Contemporary and Modern Art. Prior to this the museum relied heavily on private philanthropy. The Hennessy Art Fund has thus far allowed the collection to acquire the work of Kevin Atherton, David Beattie, Rhona Byrne and Dennis McNulty in 2016; and Ciarán Murphy, Maireád McClean, Mark Garry and Yuri Pattison in 2017.

Legal status and funding
The Museum is a company limited by guarantee and not having a share capital. The company is funded by grant-in-aid through the Department of Tourism, Culture, Arts, Gaeltacht, Sport and Media and by sponsorship, franchise and own resource income.

References

External links
 
 IMMA Collection online catalogue

Arts in Dublin (city)
Contemporary art galleries in Ireland
National museums of the Republic of Ireland
Museums in Dublin (city)
1991 establishments in Ireland
Kilmainham